Abdelkader Ben Bouali (25 October 1912 in Sendjas, Chlef Province – 23 February 1997 in Algiers) was a professional French footballer, the first of North African descent to play on the national team.

References

External links
 
 
 

1912 births
1997 deaths
People from Sendjas
French sportspeople of Algerian descent
Algerian footballers
French footballers
France international footballers
Ligue 1 players
Montpellier HSC players
FC Sète 34 players
Olympique de Marseille players
Racing Club de France Football players
Wydad AC players
1938 FIFA World Cup players
Association football defenders